Luke Thomas Farrell (born June 7, 1991) is an American professional baseball pitcher who is currently a free agent. He made his MLB debut in 2017 with the Kansas City Royals and has also played for the Chicago Cubs, Texas Rangers, Minnesota Twins, and Cincinnati Reds.

Career

Amateur
Farrell attended Saint Ignatius High School in Cleveland, Ohio, and Northwestern University, where he played college baseball for the Northwestern Wildcats. In 2010, his freshman year, he was diagnosed with a schwannoma, a benign nerve sheath tumor on his jaw, that required surgical removal. He developed another tumor that was removed and treated with radiation therapy in 2011. In his four years at Northwestern, Farrell had 208 strikeouts, and was awarded with the Big Ten Medal of Honor his senior season. In 2011, he played collegiate summer baseball with the Wareham Gatemen of the Cape Cod Baseball League, and returned to the league in 2012 to play for the Falmouth Commodores.

Kansas City Royals
The Kansas City Royals selected Farrell in the sixth round of the 2013 MLB draft. Farrell made 10 starts with Rookie Advanced level Idaho Falls, where he went 1–3 with a 6.65 ERA, although he did strike out 45 batters in 43 innings. Farrell's struggles continued in 2014 with Single-A Lexington, going 2–12 in 19 starts with a 5.25 ERA while striking out 8.5 batters per 9 innings. Farrell opened the 2015 season with High-A Wilmington, then was promoted to Double-A Northwest Arkansas in May. Farrell made 16 starts at Double-A, going 5–3 with a 3.09 ERA, although his K/9 dropped to 6.3. Farrell pitched 2016 with Triple-A Omaha, where in 19 appearances (14 starts), he went 6–3 with a 3.76 ERA. He returned to Omaha to begin the 2017 season, where he made 13 starts before earning a promotion to the major leagues on July 1.

When the Royals needed a starting pitcher for the first game of a doubleheader against the Minnesota Twins, Farrell was called up from Omaha to make his major league debut. He gave up 5 runs in 2 innings and left the game as the pitcher of record, but did not receive a loss as Kansas City came back to win the game. Originally recalled as the 26th player for the doubleheader, Farrell was optioned back to Omaha the next day. Following the Royals' acquisition of three major league pitchers from the San Diego Padres, Farrell was designated for assignment on July 24.

Los Angeles Dodgers
Farrell was traded to the Los Angeles Dodgers in exchange for cash considerations on July 28, 2017, and was assigned to the Triple-A Oklahoma City Dodgers. Farrell made one appearance for Oklahoma City, giving up 2 earned runs in 4 innings.

Cincinnati Reds
On August 9, 2017, Farrell was claimed off waivers by the Cincinnati Reds, and assigned to the Triple-A Louisville Bats. He was called up by the Reds on August 23, when he made his National League debut and pitched 3 innings of scoreless relief.

Chicago Cubs
Farrell was claimed off waivers by the Chicago Cubs on October 4, 2017. He pitched five shutout innings on June 2, 2018, against the New York Mets. On June 24, 2018, Farrell was assigned to the Triple-A Iowa Cubs. He was designated for assignment on September 1, 2018. He finished 3-4 in 20 games (2 starts). He struck out 39 batters in  innings.

Los Angeles Angels
Farrell was claimed off waivers by the Los Angeles Angels on September 3, 2018. 
On December 21, 2018, Farrell was designated for assignment by the Angels.

Texas Rangers
On January 4, 2019, Farrell was claimed off waivers by the Texas Rangers.
On March 2, 2019, Farrell was struck in the face by a line drive during a spring training game and suffered a broken jaw and a concussion. Farrell underwent surgery on March 6 to insert a plate and screws on the jaw bone. His jaw was wired shut and he was placed on a liquid diet for one month. Farrell lost 15-20 pounds during the recovery process. He was placed on the 60-day injured list to open the 2019 season. Farrell rehabbed with the AZL Rangers and Frisco RoughRiders before being activated on August 23. In 9 games for Texas in 2019, he went 1–0 with a 2.70 ERA over  innings. He pitched in 4 games in 2020, allowing 5 earned runs in 5.1 innings pitched. On October 30, 2020, Farrell was outrighted off of the 40-man roster. He became a free agent on November 2, 2020.

Minnesota Twins
On December 17, 2020, Farrell signed a minor league contract with the Minnesota Twins organization. On April 20, 2021, Farrell was selected to the active roster. On April 24, Farrell was removed from the roster after throwing one shutout inning with one strikeout. On May 19, 2021, Farrell was again selected to the active roster. Farrell made 20 appearances for the Twins, going 1-1 with a 4.74 ERA and 25 strikeouts. Farrell was outrighted off of the 40-man roster on October 8. On October 14, Farrell elected free agency.

Chicago Cubs (second stint)
On April 18, 2022, Farrell signed a minor league contract with the Chicago Cubs. He was called up from the AAA Iowa Cubs in late August. On September 6, Farrell was designated for assignment.

Cincinnati Reds (second stint)

On September 9, 2022, Farrell was claimed off waivers by the Cincinnati Reds. On September 15, he was designated for assignment.

Personal life
Luke Farrell is the youngest of three sons born to former Boston Red Sox manager John Farrell. John Farrell took a one-day leave from the Red Sox to be at Kauffman Stadium on July 1, 2017, to watch Luke make his MLB debut; the Red Sox were managed that day by bench coach Gary DiSarcina. On September 23, 2017, Luke pitched a scoreless inning of relief against the Red Sox, which was the first time in MLB history that a son pitched against a team managed by his father. Luke's brothers, Jeremy and Shane, were both selected in the MLB Draft, with Jeremy playing in the minor leagues from 2008 through 2015.

See also
List of second-generation Major League Baseball players

References

External links

Living people
1991 births
People from Westlake, Ohio
Baseball players from Ohio
Major League Baseball pitchers
Kansas City Royals players
Cincinnati Reds players
Chicago Cubs players
Texas Rangers players
Minnesota Twins players
Northwestern Wildcats baseball players
Wareham Gatemen players
Falmouth Commodores players
Idaho Falls Chukars players
Lexington Legends players
Northwest Arkansas Naturals players
Wilmington Blue Rocks players
Omaha Storm Chasers players
Arizona League Royals players
Tigres del Licey players
American expatriate baseball players in the Dominican Republic
Oklahoma City Dodgers players
Louisville Bats players
Iowa Cubs players
Arizona League Rangers players
Frisco RoughRiders players
Saint Ignatius High School (Cleveland) alumni